The Newell Falls is a waterfall on an unnamed stream that is located in the New England region of New South Wales, Australia.

Location and features
The waterfall passes down the cliff side and under a single lane bridge before entering the Bellinger River at the bottom of the valley. Picnic tables, shelter sheds and bins are located at this site. There is also a near Newell Falls lookout into the Bellinger Valley.

The Waterfall Way often closes at Newell Falls in times of heavy rainfall and flooding as the road becomes a shower of water and visibility is significantly reduced.

History 
The Newell Falls were named after Hugh Newell, who had served as New South Wales Commissioner for Main Roads from 1932 to his death in 1941. He was described as "one of the foremost road-building experts in the Commonwealth". On Saturday 6 December 1941 a memorial tablet for Newell was unveiled by Mr D. Craig, the new Commissioner for Main Road at the lookout on the Waterfall Way.

See also

List of waterfalls of Australia

References

Waterfalls of New South Wales
New England (New South Wales)
Waterfalls of the Waterfall Way
Bellingen Shire